The 2011 Victory Bowl, the 15th edition of the annual game, was a college football bowl game played on Saturday, November 19, 2011 at Finley Stadium in Campbellsville, Kentucky. The Tigers won 21–7.

Game play

First quarter
Campbellsville scored first when Diaz Bolden caught a 58 yard pass from Bobby Leonard with 14:06 remaining in the quarter.  David Hon converted the extra point with a kick to put the score to 7–0.  Later in the quarter, Greenville answered with a touchdown and extra point to tie it up 7–7, but it would be Greenville's only score for the game.

Second quarter
In the second quarter, Rodrick Dickerson recovered a fumble and returned it 82 yards to take the lead with 2:34 to play before halftime.  Campbellsville held the lead for the remainder of the game.

Third quarter
Campbellsville managed a field goal and safety in the third quarter, advancing the score to 19–7.

Fourth quarter
Campbellsville took Greenville for a second safety in the fourth quarter.  The score remained at 21–7 through the end of the game.

References 

Victory Bowl
Victory Bowl
Victory Bowl
Campbellsville Tigers football bowl games
Greenville Panthers football bowl games
November 2011 sports events in the United States
2011 in sports in Kentucky